The Colintraive Hotel (also known as The Colintraive) is a hotel and pub in Colintraive, Argyll and Bute, Scotland. It was formerly a hunting lodge for John Crichton-Stuart, 7th Marquess of Bute. It stands a few yards from the eastern shores of the Kyles of Bute and the ferry crossing of the 400-yard gap to Rhubodach on Bute, currently provided by the MV Loch Dunvegan.

Jazz guitarist Ken Sykora owned the hotel for around five years during the 1970s.

In the 1880s, the hotel was owned by Andrew Turner. In the 1890s, it was owned by a Mrs Turner.

Gallery

References

External links

Hotels in Argyll and Bute
Pubs in Scotland
Hotel buildings completed in the 19th century
19th-century establishments in Scotland
Hunting lodges in Scotland